HD 203030 is a single, yellow-orange hued star with a sub-stellar companion in the northern constellation of Vulpecula. The designation HD 203030 is from the Henry Draper Catalogue, which is based on spectral classifications made between 1911 and 1915 by Annie Jump Cannon and her co-workers, and was published between 1918 and 1924. This star is invisible to the naked eye, having an apparent visual magnitude of 8.45. It is located at a distance of 128 light years from the Sun based on parallax, and is drifting closer with a radial velocity of −17 km/s.

The stellar classification of HD 203030 is K0V, indicating this is a K-type main-sequence star. It is likely very young, belonging to the 45 million years old IC 2391 open cluster. Based on photometric measurements by Hipparcos, it was found to exhibit low amplitude periodic variability with a range of 0.0139 in magnitude and a period of 4.14 days. It is now classified as a chromospherically active BY Draconis variable. The star has 97% of the mass of the Sun and 86% of the Sun's radius. It is radiating 59% of the luminosity of the Sun from its photosphere at an effective temperature of 5,603 K.

Planetary system 
It was shown to be in a bound orbit around the star by 2014. In 2017, a reanalysis indicated that the star HD 203030 is probably very young, and therefore both the primary and the observed companion are less massive than previously thought. This places the companion object at the planetary mass boundary. In 2019, the rotational period of HD 203030 B was measured as 7.5 hours, and a patchy cloud cover was detected.

References 

K-type main-sequence stars
HD, 203030
Brown dwarfs
Planetary systems with one confirmed planet

Vulpecula
203030
105232
J10224361+5007420